Dilaver Güçlü (born 20 February 1986) is a German footballer of Turkish descent who plays for Turkish TFF Third League club Nevşehir Belediyespor. He plays attacking midfielder and left winger position.

Career

Statistics

References

External links
 
 
 
 

1986 births
People from Velbert
Sportspeople from Düsseldorf (region)
Footballers from North Rhine-Westphalia
German people of Turkish descent
Living people
German footballers
Association football midfielders
VfL Bochum II players
Manisaspor footballers
Samsunspor footballers
Denizlispor footballers
Göztepe S.K. footballers
Ankaraspor footballers
Balıkesirspor footballers
Giresunspor footballers
Gümüşhanespor footballers
Sakaryaspor footballers
Manisa FK footballers
Kocaelispor footballers
Şanlıurfaspor footballers
Oberliga (football) players
Regionalliga players
Süper Lig players
TFF First League players
TFF Second League players
TFF Third League players
German expatriate footballers
Expatriate footballers in Turkey
German expatriate sportspeople in Turkey